Darren "Bo" Taylor (January 20, 1966 – August 11, 2008) was a one-time American gang member who helped negotiate a truce following the Los Angeles riots of 1992.

Taylor was born in Memphis, Tennessee and moved to Los Angeles, California 5 years later. He joined the Crips at age 14. After graduating from Los Angeles High School and being honorably discharged after four years in the United States Navy, he drifted back into gang life before having an awakening. He founded a gang violence prevention program called Unity One and counseled inmates at the Los Angeles County Jail.

Taylor died of cancer in San Diego, California.

References

1966 births
2008 deaths
People from Los Angeles
Deaths from cancer in California
Crips